George Cope may refer to:

George Cope (MP) (c. 1534–1572), MP for Ludgershall
George A. Cope (born 1961), CEO of BCE/Bell Canada
George Cope (tobacco manufacturer) (1822–1888), English tobacco manufacturer
George Cope (artist) (1855–1929), American painter

See also
Cope (surname)